Catterline is a coastal village on the North Sea in Aberdeenshire, Scotland. Other noted architectural or historic features in the general area include Fetteresso Castle, Fiddes Castle, Chapel of St. Mary and St. Nathalan and Muchalls Castle.

Vicinity prehistory
Prehistoric features in the local area include Bronze Age archaeological recoveries at Fetteresso, Dunnottar and Spurryhillock.

Notable inhabitants
The artist Joan Eardley lived in the village in the 1950s up until her death in 1963. Many of her wild seascapes were painted here. The painter James Morrison also lived and worked in Catterline in the late 1950s, before moving to Montrose.

Scottish-Canadian communist politician Tom McEwen was a resident of Catterline between 1900 and 1904.

Local media 

Alongside the commercial enterprise of the local newspaper, the Mearns Leader, Catterline also receives broadcasts from local community radio station Mearns FM.

Education 
Catterline has a primary school.

See also
Crawton
Catterline Cartie Challenge

References

External links

Catterline Online Catterline Community Web Site
Catterline, Kinneff and Dunnottar Community Council

Villages in Aberdeenshire